Symphlebia hyalina is a moth in the subfamily Arctiinae first described by Rothschild in 1909. It is found in Colombia.

References

hyalina